Stigmella auxozona is a moth of the family Nepticulidae. It is known from Java.

External links
Nepticulidae and Opostegidae of the world

Nepticulidae
Moths of Asia
Moths described in 1934